Aurelio Dalla Vecchia (born 18 November 1958) is a sailor from Napoli, Italy, who represented his country at the 1984 Summer Olympics in Los Angeles, United States as crew member in the Soling. With helmsman Gianluca Lamaro and fellow crew member Valerio Romano they took the 9th place. Aurelio took also part in the 1988 Summer Olympics in Busan, South Korea. With same team they took the 13th place in the Soling.

References

Living people
1952 births
Sailors at the 1984 Summer Olympics – Soling
Sailors at the 1988 Summer Olympics – Soling
Olympic sailors of Italy
Sportspeople from Naples
Italian male sailors (sport)